Cock or cocks most commonly refers to:
 Cock (bird) or rooster, a male of any bird species
 Cock (slang), a slang term for the penis

Cock or cocks may also refer to:

Names
 Cock (surname)
 Cocks (surname)

Places
 Cocks Glacier, Ross Dependency, Antarctica
 Mount Cocks, Victoria Land, Antarctica
 Cock Bridge (Ljubljana), a footbridge in Ljubljana, Slovenia
 Cock Marsh, Berkshire, England, UK
 Cocks, Cornwall, a hamlet in England, UK
 Cock Beck, a stream in Yorkshire, England, UK

Pubs and bars
 The Cock, a gay bar in New York City
 The Cock, Broom, a Grade II listed public house in Broom, Bedfordshire
 The Cock, Fulham, a historic public house in London
 The Cock, St Albans, a public house in St Albans, Hertfordshire, England
 Cock Tavern Theatre, a pub theatre in Kilburn, London
 The Cock sign, a pub sign in Sutton, London

Vehicles
 Antonov An-22 or Cock, a heavy military transport aircraft
 Colditz Cock, a glider built by British Second World War prisoners of war in Colditz Castle for an escape attempt

Other uses
 Cock, a colloquial term for a small valve or a stopcock
 Cock (play), a 2009 play by Mike Bartlett
 .co.ck, a second-level domain of the Cook Islands
 Cock ale, an ale popular in 17th and 18th-century England
 Cocks baronets, two baronetcies, one extinct and one extant
 Cock Lane, a street in London
 Riihimäki Cocks, a handball team

See also
 Caulking, or caulk
 Cock a doodle doo, a popular English language nursery rhyme
 Cock and Bull (disambiguation)
 Cock Bridge (Aberdeenshire), a settlement in Aberdeenshire, Scotland
 Cockfight
 Cock ring
 Cockpit (disambiguation)
 Cocktail
 Coq, an application used in computer science
 Coque (disambiguation)
 Cox (disambiguation)
 Gamecock
 Koç, a surname
 KOC (disambiguation)
 Gun, which may be cocked, or readied to fire